Naal may refer to:
 Naal (film), a 2018 film
 Natalis of Ulster, Irish saint
 Naal Tehsil, town in Pakistan
 Naal, percussion instrument also called dholak